Andy Kennedy may refer to:

 Andy Kennedy (footballer, born 1897) (1897–1963), Northern Ireland football player, played for Arsenal
 Andy Kennedy (footballer, born 1964), Scottish professional footballer, played for Rangers, Birmingham City Blackburn Rovers and others
 Andy Kennedy (Australian footballer) (1883–1946), Australian rules footballer
 Andy Kennedy (basketball) (born 1968), American basketball coach

See also
 Andrew Kennedy (disambiguation)